Grimnitzsee is a lake in Landkreis Barnim, Brandenburg, Germany. At an elevation of 64 m, its surface area is 7.8 km². It is situated in the municipality of Joachimsthal.

See also 
Werbellinsee

External links 

 

Lakes of Brandenburg
Barnim